Carl Ernst Christoph Hess, or Carl Ernst Heß (22 January 1755, Darmstadt - 25 July 1828, Munich) was a German copper engraver and painter.

Biography
His father, Johann Heinrich Hess (1712–1768) was the court instrument maker in Darmstadt.

He was mistreated there so his aunt, Maria Magdalena, who lived in Mannheim, took him in. She was married to the court medallist and gold engraver, Jacob Hohleisen (b. 1707), who took him on as an apprentice. A hunting scene he created on the handle of a  Hirschfänger, a type of dagger, brought him to the attention of Maximilian III Joseph, Elector of Bavaria.

As a result, he was able to attend the Kunstakademie Düsseldorf where his talents were noticed by its Director, Lambert Krahe. During 1776, he studied engraving in Augsburg and, the following year, worked on the gallery collection that had been initiated by Krahe's son, Peter Joseph Krahe. He became a member of the Academy in 1780, and was promoted to Professor in 1782. That same year, he was appointed as court engraver. He went to Italy in 1787 and remained there for four years, studying his art in Naples and Rome, where he met Johann Wolfgang Goethe.

In 1791, the year after Lambert Krahe's death, Hess married his daughter, Marie Lambertine Katharine Krahe. When the War of the First Coalition began to affect Düsseldorf, they moved about for several years, during which he worked with Francesco Bartolozzi in London. In 1806, the gallery collection he was curating was moved to Munich and he went to work for Maximilian I Joseph of Bavaria.

He and Marie had six children; two daughters, and four sons who all became artists: Peter, Heinrich, Franz (1795-1819), and Karl. His daughter, Katharina, married the architect Friedrich von Gärtner. She died in 1832 and, two years later, he married her sister, Lambertine (1804-1852).

Heßstraße, in Maxvorstadt, was named after him and his sons.

Further reading 
 
 Allgemeine deutsche Real-Encyklopädie für die gebildeten Stände., 1834, Vol.5, pg.254 (Online @ Google Books).

External links 

 Works by Hess @ the Harvard Art Museums
 

1755 births
1828 deaths
German engravers
Kunstakademie Düsseldorf alumni
Academic staff of Kunstakademie Düsseldorf
Artists from Darmstadt